Finchley Catholic High School is a boys' secondary school with a coeducational sixth form in North Finchley, part of the London Borough of Barnet, England. The current head teacher is Niamh Arnull, who had previously been a member of the teaching staff in the 1990s.

Admissions
Finchley Catholic High School is a faith school; it is also – up to the end of year 11 – exclusively for boys.

It is a school for boys aged 11–18, with a coeducational sixth form. The sixth form is increasing in size, and 25% of the intake is offered to girls since the 2007–08 academic year.

Location
The school is situated to the west of Finchley's High Road (A1000), and immediately to the east of that stretch of the Northern Line which constitutes the school's western boundary. Lying adjacent to the postcode boundaries of Whetstone (N20) and Woodside Park (N12), it is roughly halfway between Woodside Park and Totteridge & Whetstone Underground stations.

History

Finchley Catholic Grammar School was founded in 1926 by Clement Henry Parsons (1892–1980), parish priest of St. Alban's Catholic Church, Nether Street, North Finchley. He founded the Challoner School (a fee-paying grammar school for boys who had not passed their 11+); as well as St. Alban's Catholic Preparatory School ("The Prep" – now absorbed into Woodside Park International School) as a feeder primary for the Grammar and Challoner schools. 1971 saw its two institutional forebears, Finchley Catholic Grammar School ("Finchley Grammar") and the Challoner School, merge to become Finchley Catholic High School. It was the sister school of the all-girls St. Michael's Catholic Grammar School during the grammar school era.

Traditions
Its motto, Da Nobis Recta Sapere (Grant that we may be truly wise) comes from the collect (opening prayer) of the Mass of Pentecost. The school newsletter, "The Albanian", is named after the school's patron saint, St Alban, Britain's protomartyr. It is sent out six times a year (every half term) to all parents, governors and other key members of the school community.

Ethos
The school has a Catholic ethos. Religious education is taught twice a week in Key Stage 3 (years 7, 8 and 9); and, as in all Catholic schools in England, the GCSE is compulsory (Key Stage 4 – years 10 and 11), being taught three times weekly.

Products with the Fairtrade Certification Mark are encouraged, and the school has an action group dedicated to making Barnet a Fairtrade borough. Every year, during Lent, pupils raise money for charities such as CAFOD (Catholic Agency for Overseas Development), and various local and national charities, including the neighbouring (and non-denominational) North London Hospice.

Sport
Facilities include a recently installed full size astroturf pitch and playing fields in nearby Southover, a street in Woodside Park Garden Suburb, the other side of Dollis Brook. Of particular note was the archery club. From 1965 until 1972 they were undefeated in interschool competition.

On 26 April 2018, Finchley's year 10 football team qualified for the ESFA U15 National Cup Final overcoming Carshalton Sports College 3–1 in the Semi-final. Goals scored by Luke Ainsworth, Luke Traynor and Louis Setoudeh were enough to take the school through to the first National Cup Final in the school's history. The school played St Francis Xavier's College from Liverpool in the final at the Madjeski Stadium (Reading) on 22 May 2018.

The same team that got to the ESFA U15 National Cup Final also won the Middlesex county cup three years in a row making it the first time in the history of the Middlesex cup that it had happened, their third Middlesex county cup win is most known thanks to Ehimen Osebore doing the milly rock as a goal celebration.

Music and drama
The show "Remember" written by Mark Sell and Lena Santos, was performed by students of FCHS and St. Michael's. It is about the remembrance of the Holocaust, and has been to Poland, where it was the first-ever performance in the Auschwitz camp itself. Music includes partisan music, and other music with Yiddish and Hebrew lyrics.

Science and engineering
The school offers a government-funded engineering club to Key Stage 3. It is currently working on making a green energy supply to run an oxygenating system for the school pond, in the form of a wind turbine.

Languages
French or Spanish are compulsory throughout Key Stage 3, and optional at GCSE. French is also taught up to A2 level. There are after-school lessons in Latin, which is available up to GCSE (no longer available).

School buildings
The school's buildings vary in age and quality:

 The 'White House', built in 1872 by Cubitt, is the school's oldest building. Grade II listed, it houses the school's reception, main offices, a small chapel and a medical centre.
 The Bourne Block, completed in 1936, is the largest building and houses most of the classrooms, as well as the former Sixth Form common room (now a staff room) and a newly built business centre.
 The Challoner Block, completed in 1954, originally housed the separate Challoner School, until it became part of FCHS in 1971. It contains the second largest number of classrooms.
 Bampfield House, a private residence built before 1920, was acquired in the early 1950s as a dormitory block for the Challoner School. FCHS used it as a music and drama centre until the construction of the Performing Arts Centre  (see below).
 The School Hall, built in 1956 and originally used solely as a chapel, now functions as an assembly hall.
 The Stephenson Block, (named after the late chemistry teacher, "Mo" Stephenson), also known as the '1971 Block', houses the ICT and art rooms, a small library and the recently renovated cafeteria.
 The Performing Arts Centre, built in 2004 and opened by local girl Emma Bunton ("Baby Spice"), replaced Bampfield House as a multi-purpose music and drama centre, including three music rooms and a drama studio. It also houses a seminar room for conferences.
 Canon Parsons Sixth Form Centre built in 2014 and opened by Bishop John Sherrington it cost £3 million to build. It replaced the former music and drama centre Bampfield house.

There are two other buildings of note. 
 Challoner Lodge (originally 'Feckenham Lodge'), built around 1930 as a kind of dower house for the founder's aged mother, is now the school keeper's residence.
 Parsons Lodge, originally the coachman's lodge for the 'White House' and also Grade II listed, was recently converted into two private flats.

School houses
The school is made up of 5 (sometimes 6) houses, which are represented by each year's form classes, which in turn are represented by the colour of stripes on their ties. These are named after prominent Catholics (mostly with some personal connection to Finchley): Bampfield (green), Bourne (blue), Feckenham (gold), Fisher (white), Challoner (red), More (purple) and Alban (orange).  Orange is not always included, but sometimes another form is made to accommodate more pupils, typically every other year.

The forms (houses) each have their own letter, which together make up the initials of the school. This is FRCHSB, standing for Finchley Roman Catholic High School for Boys, and each letter is for a different form.

At the beginning of the 2006–07 school year, another tie colour, orange, was introduced due to a complication about the number of pupils admitted that year.

As stated by the school:
  is Green Tie. Bampfield
 R() is Blue Tie. Bourne
  is Gold Tie (often referred to as Yellow – Yellow and Gold being heraldically equivalent). Feckenham
  is White Tie. Fisher
  is Red Tie. Challoner
  is Purple Tie. Moore
  is Orange tie

At the start of the 2014 academic year they removed orange tie.

For some lessons, classes partner up with another one:

 Green tie and Blue tie pair up, Gold/Yellow tie and White tie pair up, and Purple tie and Red tie pair up. 
 For Spanish, White tie, Red tie and Purple tie partner up and for French Green tie, Blue tie and Gold/Yellow tie are partnered up.

Notable old boys
 Declan Danaher, former rugby player, back row London Irish
 Tony Gallagher, former editor of The Sun and Daily Telegraph, now deputy editor The Times
 Giuliano Grazioli, former striker for Swindon Town and Barnet
 Martin Ivens, former editor, The Sunday Times
 Dennis Kelly, theatre and television writer
 Paul Rincon, BBC News, broadcast journalist, specialist in science & technology
 Christian Maghoma, DR Congo international footballer
 RV (rapper) British rapper and songwriter
 Pelly Ruddock Mpanzu, Professional footballer for Luton Town

Finchley Grammar School

 Aidan Bellenger OSB (born 1950), former Abbot of Downside Abbey
 Christopher Bliss, Nuffield Professor of International Economics from 1992 to 2007 at the University of Oxford, and brother of Jill Paton Walsh
 James Bredin, former BBC news and documentary producer, managing director from 1964 to 1982 of Border Television, and directed ITN's first broadcast in 1955
 Air Vice-Marshal Robert Chapple, Principal Medical Officer of the RAF from 1991 to 1994
 Terry Forrestal, stuntman base jumper; former soldier
 Michael Gorman, librarian, writer & lecturer
 Sir John Hegarty, founder of global advertising agency Bartle Bogle Hegarty
 Jerry Lordan, composer of hits Apache and Wonderful Land for The Shadows
 Troy Kennedy Martin, screenwriter; co-creator of 1960s British TV hit series Z-Cars, scripted 1960s classic The Italian Job
 John Leslie Marshall, Conservative former MEP for London North and former mayor of Barnet London Borough Council
 Eric Merriman, radio comedy writer
 Nicholas J. Phillips, UK hologram pioneer
 Sir Hugh Rossi, Conservative MP for Hornsey, then Hornsey and Wood Green, 1966–92

References

External links
 Finchley Catholic High School website

Boys' schools in London
Educational institutions established in 1926
Catholic secondary schools in the Archdiocese of Westminster
Secondary schools in the London Borough of Barnet
1926 establishments in England
Voluntary aided schools in London